Atelopus gigas is a species of frog in the family Bufonidae. It has not been seen since 1970 and is considered possibly extinct.

Taxonomy
Atelopus gigas was described in 2010. The specific name gigas comes from the Greek word for giant. It was given for the species' large size.

Description
Atelopus gigas is one of the largest species in its genus, with males ranging from 43 to 48 mm long and females being larger at 43–57 mm long. Females have longer, more slender limbs than males, while males possess vocal slits.

Habitat and distribution
Atelopus gigas is only known from the type locality of La Victoria, Departamento Nariño near the border between Colombia and Ecuador.

References

gigas
Amphibians of Colombia
Amphibians of Ecuador
Amphibians described in 2010
Taxa named by Luis Aurelio Coloma
Taxa named by William Edward Duellman